Matelea carolinensis is a species of flowering plant in the family Apocynaceae known by the common names maroon Carolina milkvine and Carolina anglepod. It is native to the southeastern United States, where it grows in open deciduous woods and stream banks.  It is a perennial twining vine forb/herb with milky sap and 5 to 10 cm heart-shaped leaves.  The vine dies back and returns every year.  The 1 to 2 cm flowers are deep purple, occasionally yellow. The fruit is a follicle.

References

External links
eol Encyclopedia of Life
bioimages

carolinensis
Flora of the Southeastern United States
Plants described in 1788
Flora without expected TNC conservation status